Karen Brancourt (born 15 March 1962) is an Australian former national representative and Olympic medal winning rower.

Brancourt's senior rowing was done with the Torrens Rowing Club in South Australia. She won a bronze medal in the coxed four at the 1984 Summer Olympics, rowing in the two seat. It was Australia's first Olympic medal in women's rowing.

References 

 
 

1962 births
Living people
Australian female rowers
Rowers at the 1984 Summer Olympics
Olympic bronze medalists for Australia
Olympic medalists in rowing
Medalists at the 1984 Summer Olympics
20th-century Australian women